Laguerre is a surname. Notable people with the surname include:

Edmond Laguerre (1834-1886), French mathematician
Enrique Laguerre (1905-2005), Puerto Rican writer
Jean Henri Georges Laguerre (born 1858), French lawyer and politician
John Laguerre (1688-1748), French historical painter, son of Louis Laguerre
Louis Laguerre (1663-1721), French painter of the English school